Juan Domingo Rocchia is a retired professional footballer.  He played for Racing Club and Ferro Carril Oeste in the Argentine Primera.

He played in central defence and he formed a famous partnership with Héctor Cúper in his time at Ferro Carril Oeste. He played 377 games for Ferro, putting him 6th on their all time appearances list.

His nickname was Burro (Donkey), he was a famously combative player and a great header of the ball. He was also very good at taking free kicks and he scored 78 goals in his career (very impressive for a defender). He is Ferro Carril Oeste's 4th highest goalscorer of all time.

Roccia played for the Argentina national football team in 1975 under the managership of César Luis Menotti.

In 1982, he was an integral part of the  Ferro Carril Oeste team that became only the second team after San Lorenzo to win the Primera without losing a single game.

In 1981, he helped goalkeeper Carlos Barisio set an Argentine record of 1,075 minutes without conceding a goal.

Titles

Coaching career
Rocchia was joint manager of Ferro between 1999 and 2000 with Jorge Brandoni.

References

1951 births
People from Rafaela
Living people
Argentine footballers
Ferro Carril Oeste footballers
Racing Club de Avellaneda footballers
Argentina international footballers
Argentine football managers
Ferro Carril Oeste managers
Association football defenders
Sportspeople from Santa Fe Province